Ali Bunow Korane is the former Governor of Garissa County, Kenya. He assumed the office in August 2017 as the 2nd incumbent governor of Garissa after the 2017 general.

Ali Korane was born in Balambala, Garissa, he is from a Somali Muslim family. He obtained his Bachelor and Masters of Art in International Studies and Diplomacy both from the Washington University.

Ali Korane joined the Kenya Army as 2nd Lieutenant and was posted to 50 Air Cavalry Battalion. He was later trained as a helicopter pilot on the McDonnell Douglas MD 500 Defender anti-tank helicopter.
Ali Korane is accused of masterminding, plotting and Shooting of Mr Idriss Aden Muktar, the former Finance executive during Governor Nathif Jama's term, Who is currently in a coma.

Administrative and Politics 
After retirement from the army he joined the Provincial Administration where he later served as a Permanent Secretary in three various Ministries, the Ministry of Tourism and Information, Ministry of Home Affairs and Ministry of Sports. Ali Korane was also the special envoy- Horn of Africa in 2010 after he was assigned the post by President Uhuru Kenyatta to coordinate peace in the country.

References

External links 

 
 
 

People from Garissa County
Year of birth missing (living people)
Personnel of the Kenya Army
Jubilee Party politicians
Kenyan Muslims
University of Washington alumni
Living people